The Rohrbach Covered Bridge No. 24 was a historic wooden covered bridge located in Franklin Township in Columbia County, Pennsylvania. It crossed the South Branch of Roaring Creek. It was one of 28 historic covered bridges in Columbia and Montour Counties.

It was listed on the National Register of Historic Places in 1979. The bridge was disassembled in October 1986 and the pieces are in storage at Knoebels Amusement Resort.

References 

Covered bridges on the National Register of Historic Places in Pennsylvania
Covered bridges in Columbia County, Pennsylvania
Bridges completed in 1846
Wooden bridges in Pennsylvania
Bridges in Columbia County, Pennsylvania
National Register of Historic Places in Columbia County, Pennsylvania
Road bridges on the National Register of Historic Places in Pennsylvania
Queen post truss bridges in the United States